Rules is a London restaurant on Maiden Lane in Covent Garden. Rules was founded in 1798 by Thomas Rule, and describes itself as London's oldest restaurant.

History 

Rules was opened by Thomas Rule in 1798, primarily as an oyster bar but served, and continues to serve, traditional British cuisine.  Rules specialises in game and has its own estate, the Lartington Estate, in Teesdale.
Thomas Rule was later committed to a psychiatric hospital for murder of his wife Isabella and daughter Elsie Rule

The restaurant stayed in the Rule family until World War I, when Charles Rule swapped businesses with Thomas Bell. Bell's daughter subsequently sold the restaurant to the current owner John Mayhew in 1984.

Efforts have been made to carefully preserve the original features in the main restaurant and in the cocktail bar.  The walls are decorated with a series of sketches, oil paintings and cartoons which have been collected throughout its history.  A number of its artworks depict theatrical history.  Rules has been frequented by Henry Irving and Laurence Olivier amongst others.

The restaurant has featured in novels by Graham Greene, Dick Francis, Dorothy L. Sayers and Evelyn Waugh. John Betjeman complained to the Greater London Council in 1971 when the restaurant was under threat from demolition.

The then-head chef of Rules, Rory Kennedy was featured in the cooking series, Iron Chef, where he challenged Iron Chef French, Hiroyuki Sakai. The two would finish in a draw for the theme of European Rabbit. A tiebreaker was then held with the theme of Pigeon, where Sakai prevailed. Later in the year, however, Kennedy fell from a flight of stairs and subsequently died from his injuries.

Rules made an appearance in the James Bond film Spectre and several appearances in the historical drama Downton Abbey.

References

External links

Grade II listed buildings in the City of Westminster
Restaurants established in 1798
European restaurants in London
Tourist attractions in the City of Westminster
British companies established in 1798
British cuisine